The 1992 McDonald's All-American Boys Game was an All-star basketball game played on Sunday, April 19, 1992 at the Alexander Memorial Coliseum in Atlanta, Georgia. The game's rosters featured the best and most highly recruited high school boys graduating in 1992. The game was the 15th annual version of the McDonald's All-American Game first played in 1978.

1992 game
The game was telecast live by CBS. The event took place on Easter; while several players were undecided at the time of selection, only Othella Harrington had still not made a choice about his college career when the game started: Bright, Edwards, Lloyd and Wallace all committed in April, just a few days before the All-American game. Since the game was played in Atlanta, the local favorite was Carlos Strong of Athens, Georgia, one of the top-ranked recruits at the time: he had a good performance, scoring 19 points. Harrington received the MVP award after 19 points and 21 rebounds; other players who starred were Corliss Williamson, who also had a double-double with 14 points and 10 rebounds; Jason Kidd, who entertained the crowd with his passing and handling skills, ending the game with 12 points and 6 rebounds; Tony Delk, who scored 15 points; and Michael Lloyd, who scored 17. Of the 20 players, 6 went on to play at least 1 game in the NBA.

East roster

West roster

Coaches
The East team was coached by:
 Head Coach Wendell Byrd of South Lakes High School (Reston, Virginia)

The West team was coached by:
 Head Coach Willie Boston of Westover High School (Albany, Georgia)

All-American Week

Contest winners 
 The 1992 Slam Dunk contest was won by Carlos Strong.
 The 1992 3-point shoot-out was won by Chris Collins.

References

External links
McDonald's All-American on the web
McDonald's All-American all-time rosters
McDonald's All-American rosters at Basketball-Reference.com
Game stats at Realgm.com

1991–92 in American basketball
1992